The 1908 Iowa gubernatorial election was held on November 3, 1908. Republican nominee Beryl F. Carroll defeated Democratic nominee Frederick Edward White with 54.60% of the vote.

General election

Candidates
Major party candidates
Beryl F. Carroll, Republican
Frederick Edward White, Democratic 

Other candidates
K. W. Brown, Prohibition
I. S. McCrillis, Socialist
Luman Hamlin Weller, Independent
D. C. Cowles, People's

Results

References

1908
Iowa
Gubernatorial